World Wild is the fifth studio album by Swedish Eurodance artist Jonny Jakobsen, released in 2007.

The tone and lyrical style of the songs continue Jakobsen's ethnic satire theme but, this time, each song is dedicated to a different nation and the typical subjects of their respective cultures, such as Skiing in Switzerland or Pharaohs in Egypt. The songs are sung from the perspective of Carlito as he embarks upon a tour of the world.

The album was released as a successor to Fiesta, another Carlito album. Carlito is so far the only one of Jakobsen's fictional identities to be associated with more than one studio album without any change in style. According to the official Carlito website, the decision to release a successor to Fiesta was prompted by its outstanding success in Japan.

Track listing
Russkij Pusskij – 3:05
Sukiyaki Teriyaki – 3:05
Be My Pharaoh – 2:58
Americo – 3:28
Africa – 3:26
All Around The World – 3:36
Bolero – 3:12
Jamaica – 3:35
Crazy Carlito – 2:56
Final Call – 2:54
Holiday – 3:33
Backpack Girl – 3:27
Samba De Janeiro – 3:12
Home Sweet Home – 2:40

References

External links
Official Carlito website
Carlito at Bubblegum Dancer
Carlito at last.fm

2006 albums
Jonny Jakobsen albums
Warner Records albums